The battle of Kumher was fought among Jats, Marathas and Mughals.

Battle
Kumher was founded by a Jat chieftain Kumbh. In 1754, when Suraj Mal was the king, the fort came under siege by Marathas, as peshwa Balaji Baji Rao's younger brother Raghunathrao (Supported by Scindias and Holkars) wanted to be subservient to them. However the siege did not succeed. In 1754, on behest of Mughal Emperor Alamgir II, Khanderao laid the siege of Kumher fort of Suraj Mal of Bharatpur, who had the sided with the Alamgir II's adversary Siraj ud-Daulah. Khanderao Holkar, son of Malhar Rao Holkar, was inspecting his troops on an open palanquin in the battle of kumher when he was hit and killed by a cannonball from the Jat army. Marathas (particularly Scindias and Holkars) signed a treaty with Suraj Mal and withdrew their army. To honor Khanderao, Suraj Mal built a chhatri on the cremation spot of Khanderao at Kumher.

References

Kumher
1754 in India
Kumher
Kumher